Furzehill is a hamlet in the North Devon district of Devon, England. The hamlet is situated in the Exmoor National Park, near the Devon-Somerset border.

Hamlets in Devon